A stick figure, also known as a stick man, is a very simple drawing of a 
person or an animal, composed of a few lines, curves, and dots.   It is often drawn by children, and known for its simplistic style. On a stick figure, the head is most often represented by a circle, which can be either a solid color or sometimes embellished with details such as eyes, a mouth, or hair. The arms, legs, torso, and abdomen are usually represented with these straight lines. Details such as hands, feet, and a neck may be present or absent; simpler stick figures often display an ambiguous emotional expression or disproportionate limbs, however, most stick figures can be drawn with four or three fingers.

The stick figure is a universally recognizable symbol, in all likelihood one of the most well known in the world. It transcends language, location, demographics, and can trace back its roots for almost 30,000 years. Its simplicity and versatility led to the stick figure being used for a variety of purposes: info graphics, signage, comics, animations, games, film storyboards, and many kinds of visual media all employ the stick figure. With the advent of the World Wide Web, the stick figure became a central element within an entire genre of web-based interactive entertainment known as flash animation. Over a period of more than two decades, stick figure animation impacted and shaped the visual landscape of the internet.

History 

The stick figure's earliest roots are in prehistoric art. Some of the most revealing and informative markers of early human life are cave paintings and petroglyphs, ancient depictions covering a variety of subjects left behind on stone walls. Visual representations of people, animals, and depictions of daily life can be found displayed across the walls of numerous habitation sites all over the world, such as depictions of mimis in Australia. Tens of thousands of years later, writing systems that use images for words or morphemes instead of letters—so-called logographies, such as Egyptian and Chinese—started simplifying people and other objects to be used as linguistic symbols.

In Mandaean manuscripts, uthras (celestial beings) are illustrated using stick figures.

In the early 1920s, Austrian sociologist Otto Neurath developed an interest in the concept of universal language. He quickly established the idea that, while words and phrases could always be misunderstood, pictures had a certain unifying quality that made them a perfect fit for his project. In 1925, Neurath began work on what would become the international system of typographic picture education, or isotype, a system of conveying warnings, statistics, and general information through standardized and easily understandable pictographs. Neurath made significant use of the versatile stick figure design to represent individuals and statistics in a variety of ways. Graphic designer Rudolf Modley founded Pictorial Statistics Inc. in 1934 and brought the isotype system to the United States in 1972.

The first international use of stick figures dates back to the 1964 Summer Olympics in Tokyo. Pictograms created by Japanese designers Masaru Katzumie  and Yoshiro Yamashita formed the basis of future pictograms. In 1972, Otto "Otl" Aicher developed the round-ended, geometric grid-based stick figures used on the signage, printed materials, and television for the 1972 Summer Olympics in Munich. Drawing on those and many other similar symbol sets in use at the time, the American Institute of Graphic Arts (AIGA), commissioned by the U.S. Department of Transportation, developed the DOT pictograms: 50 public domain symbols for use at transportation hubs, public spaces, large events, and other contexts in which people speak a wide variety of different languages. The DOT pictograms, or symbols derived from them, are used widely throughout much of the world today.

Internet culture

1990s 
In the early 1990s, internet pioneer and programmer Tom Fulp began to produce 2D stick figure animations on his Amiga computer for entertainment purposes. Soon, his interest expanded to include simple game design via HTML. Fulp also developed a passion for the Neo Geo series of gaming consoles and was at the time running an online club centered around Neo Geo using the Prodigy web service. In 1991, he created a fan-made magazine for members of the club, which he would continue to produce throughout his time in 7th and 8th grade. The name of this fan magazine was "new ground", a synonym for Neo Geo. Four years later, Fulp launched a small website to host some of his game projects under the name "newground remix". In the years that followed, this project morphed into Newgrounds, one of the most influential hosting platforms for user generated content in internet history.

At about the same time, Californian computer programmer Jonathan Gay and software entrepreneur Charlie Jackson founded the software company FutureWave and began work on a vector-based drawing program called SmartSketch to be used in conjunction with digital tablets. The program was ultimately a commercial failure, but Gay and Jackson came up with a new idea that they believed would prove to be a much greater success: a web-based drawing and animation program that they named "FutureSplash". In January 1997, four years after the founding of FutureWave, the company was acquired by software giant Macromedia with the primary goal being the acquisition of FutureSplash. The program's versatility and compact design had made it ideal for web media playback and production, and Macromedia was eager to capitalize on the software's increasing popularity. Re-branded into "Macromedia Flash", the software proved to be an even bigger success than FutureSplash, quickly becoming the universal standard for web animation production and playback.

1998-2005: increased popularity 
Tom Fulp started working with Flash soon after the Macromedia acquisition, producing his first game with the software, "Telebubby Fun Land", in 1998. Despite the limited capabilities of the animator, Flash games were unprecedented. The publication of Fulp's 1999 point-and-click Flash game classic "Pico's School" kicked off the exponential growth of the genre's popularity. As a result, Newgrounds soon became a major hub of online activity. In 2000, Fulp introduced a portal system through which users could submit Flash animations and games of their own. Other game and animation aggregator sites such as "Addicting Games" followed soon after, and even older, more niche animation platforms such as "stickdeath.com" and "stick figure death theater" reached wider notoriety.

Xiao Xiao 
On April 19, 2001, Chinese animator Zhu Zhiqiang uploaded a 75-second-long video titled "Xiao Xiao" on the newly formed Newgrounds animation portal. Accompanied by bit-crushed audio samples, it shows two simple stick figures fighting with their fists and various weapons over a white background. Inspired by over-the-top, Hong-Kong-style martial arts films, Zhiqiang let his figures perform flips, flying kicks, and a number of other exaggerated attacks and defenses. As the fight gets increasingly intense, more tools including a bow and arrow, rocket launchers, and duplication abilities are added to the mix before the battle comes to a final, violent conclusion. With this simple formula, "Xiao Xiao" quickly became the most popular Flash animation ever created. Spawning countless imitations and "Xiao-Xiao-style" descendants, it turned into the blueprint for an entire sub genre of 2D animation that has garnered hundreds of millions of views since.

Other notable events (2001-2005) 

 Late 2001: Canadian animator Jason Whitham creates stickpage.com, an animation hosting website focused on stick figure animation and flash games. At the height of its popularity, stickpage.com had nearly one million visitors per month. 
 July 13, 2003: Newgrounds.com user "IGSDann" publishes the Flash game "A true stick death", rapidly increasing the popularity of the genre. Later that year, user "qwerqwer1234" releases "mudah.swf", a comedic series of fight sequences inspired by  the Japanese manga series JoJo's Bizarre Adventure.
 December 7, 2003: "壁破き", or "Stickman vs Wall", an animation video in which a stick figure uses increasingly elaborate and advanced methods and tools to break down a wall, is released, marking the beginning for an entire sub-genre within the stick animation community.
 2004: Armor Games, another major Flash sites, goes online.
 June 2, 2005: The original "Storm the House" survival Flash game is posted for the first time on Addicting Games by user "IvoryDrive".
 September 2005: The famous webcomic xkcd, which uses stick figures in humorous contexts often relating to science, philosophy, technology and internet culture, debuts.

2005-2016 
On December 3, 2005, Adobe Systems Inc. acquired the entirety of Macromedia, once again rebranding Macromedia's now ubiquitous Flash software. Almost a decade earlier, Adobe had turned down an offer to buy FutureSplash in favor of their own Acrobat system. Now, the tables had turned and the corporation was buying flash's new owner for USD 3.4 billion. With this acquisition, the program entered its final and most recognizable stage of development. Adobe spearheaded Flash animation for the next decade and a half, and it was during this period that Flash facilitated some of the most recognizable stick figure animations and games of all time.

Animator vs. Animation 
Created by animator, YouTuber, and artist Alan Becker, the first episode of "Animator vs. Animation" premiered on newgrounds.com on June 3, 2006. It showed a stick figure fighting to break out of the animation program it was created in. The video has garnered almost 80 million views since its publication. As of March 2023, the series contains five main episodes and a number of spin-offs, among them include the video "Animation vs. Minecraft", which has gained over 305 million views as of March 2022. In total, all of Alan Becker's animation videos were watched over four and a half billion times with the vast majority of them being centered around stick figure animation.

Pivot Animator 
While Adobe Flash was at every point in time the most popular Flash animation tool, there were other competitors, most notably Pivot Animator (formerly Pivot Stickfigure Animator). Created in 2005 by software developer Peter Bone, the program was specifically geared towards stick figure animation. Unlike Adobe Flash, which had grown into a highly complex 2D animation environment, Pivot Animator, with its simplicity allowed virtually anyone to create stick figure animations without requiring any form of expertise. This brought the ability to create and distribute quality stick animations to a much greater audience than before, and alongside Flash, Pivot Animator soon became another central tool for the countless internet users who were caught up in the trend.

Hyun's Dojo Community 
Around 2012, popular stick figure animator Hyun created a brand new stick figure community after the shut down of Fluidanims. Hyun's Dojo is a primarily animation community, owned by the titular animator, which hosts collaborations, crossovers, and the popular Dojo duels wherein two animators create animated fights against one another for points known as "Rice". The community consists of a website, an official Twitter, and a YouTube channel. Hyun's Dojo Community's first video was posted on December 30, 2012; followed by "Hyun's Dojo Promo" on March 9, 2013; "The Dojo Collab" on August 23, 2013; and finally, "Hyun's Dojo - Create Together" on August 24, 2013. Around 2015, Hyunsdojo.com was created, followed by a Discord server as a hub for animators and community members to collaborate and communicate with one another. In that time, the community was composed mostly of stick figure animators that popularized the art and animation form. However, the community has expanded past stick figures throughout the years. As of March 2021, the YouTube channel has reached over 2 million subscribers. The community posted a collaboration to celebrate the occasion. The channel slowly continues to grow in influence in the Internet stick figure community.

This is Bob 
At some point between June 2008 and April 2009, an internet copypasta began to appear featuring a Unicode stick figure named Bob. There was an initial surge in popularity in April 2009, leading to a hostile response from the YouTube community wherein the community would flag the copypasta as spam. This spread of the copypasta would reach its peak in search interest around June 2010 before declining gradually. However, on September 24, 2013, YouTube announced that they would be integrating the YouTube Comments section with Google+. In response, the YouTube community brought back the Bob copypasta in a new form, with Bob "building an army" against Google+. This resulted in the biggest spike in popularity for the copypasta, reaching its peak popularity in November 2013.

Other notable events
 2004: Castle II, the first stick figure animation series to adopt a cinematic style (with shade and lighting effects for the character), was released. Castle has been considered one of the top stick figure animations of all time, especially for Stickpage. It is widely available on YouTube, with hundred of thousands to millions of views . Castle, with its lighting, intricate detailing on the character's eyes, use of 3D technology, and acclaimed soundtrack by Aleksander Vinter along with subtitles, has been praised  for achieving a movie-like experience. A total of 12 feature-length episodes have been released. As of 2009, all episodes up to Castle Repercussions D2 have been released. An upcoming Castle IV installment to conclude the story of Castle is on indefinite hiatus as of March 2022, although there is a teaser of it on YouTube. 
 July 4th, 2006: The first episode of stick figure animation series Tha Cliff by xefpatterson is released. As of 2021, three episodes have been released. Together, they have been watched over 40 million times and inspired countless fan-made imitations.
 August 26, 2006: "wpnFire", a stick figure action Flash game, is first published on Newgrounds.com. Since its release, it has been played over 2.3 million times.
 October 10, 2006: Yet another content hosting platform, Kongregate, is launched. It hosts a number of highly popular flash games, among them "Electric Man 2" and the "Shopping Cart Hero" trilogy, which accumulated over 15 million plays.
 2007: The first episode of "Shock Series", a high-octane stick figure fighting series featuring over-the-top combat combined with Lolspeak-one liners, is released. Today, reuploads of the series on YouTube have tens of millions of views.
March 17, 2008: the first episode of the "Crazy Stick Figure Randomness!!" series premieres on YouTube.
 December 24, 2008: Flipnote, another competitor to Adobe Flash and Pivot, is released. While not as popular as the aforementioned two, Flipnote does serve a role in the productions of stick figure media until the software's termination in 2018.
 June 2009: Jason Whitham, the founder of stickpage.com, releases a large-scale stick figure combat simulator titled "Stick War".
 In the same month, YouTuber and animator "TheAssassin650" publishes the first installment of his influential "Blue vs Green" animation series.
July 15, 2009: The first episode of the "Stick Figures On Crack" animation series by Hopdiddy premiered on YouTube.
November 18, 2010: The first episode of Dick Figures, an adult animated webseries created by Ed Skudder and Zack Keller, is published on YouTube by Mondo Media. The series finished with over 50 episodes and 250 million views.
July 23, 2021: Popular stick figure animator and Hyun's Dojo member Gildedguy received a cosmetic outfit for Epic Games’ Fortnite: Battle Royale as a promotion for the "Shortnite" film festival.

2017-2021: The end of Flash 
In July 2017, Adobe Systems, which had continued to support and develop both Flash Animator and Flash Player for the past 12 years, announced that they would officially end support for the program by the end of the decade. This decision had far-reaching consequences as it entailed not only the end of development on the software but also the official end of sites that still supported Flash and the deactivation of virtually every instance of Flash player via a built-in kill switch. A number of safety issues and more versatile alternatives like HTML5 had rendered Flash obsolete. Flash advocates and fans called for preservation efforts to ensure not all games, animations and other types of Flash media would be lost forever.

Preservation efforts 
Following Adobe's announcement of their intentions to retire Flash, the community began efforts to preserve the genre's history. In January 2018, a YouTuber named Ben Latimore, going by the online handle "BlueMaxima", started up a community project called Flashpoint. The aim of the project was to document, categorize, and most importantly preserve two decades of Flash history, culture, and community. BlueMaxima's Flashpoint grew to serve as a massive archive, a library for the most influential and renowned Flash animations and games in internet history, for anyone to view and experience. The project started slowly, but once word began to spread about the initiative, the development team began to grow and the library began to expand exponentially. Xiao Xiao, Shock Series, WPNFire, Storm the House, and countless other stick figure games and animations were saved and archived over the coming months and years.

Despite the impending demise of Flash, its final years saw the release of some of the most popular and most polished stick figure animations and games of all time. Notable examples include "Combat Gods" (released June 5, 2019) Collection of Henry Stickmin (August 7 2022) and the half-hour long "Animator vs. Animation V" (December 5, 2020).
Finally, on January 12, 2021, all instances of Flash player ceased operation, all Flash media refused to play, and Adobe Flash was officially retired. Due to the conservation efforts of Project Flashpoint, and because of big hosting platforms like Newgrounds and Kongregate developing their own workarounds, the Flash community, and, with it, the stick figure animation subgenre, were preserved from extinction. Creators from that point onward found alternatives for the now defunct software, such as Pivot and Flash's official successor, Adobe Animate.

Unicode

As of Unicode version 13.0, there are five stick figure characters in the Symbols for Legacy Computing block.
These are in the codepoints U+1FBC5 to U+1FBC9.

OpenMoji supports the five characters along with joining character sequences to give the other figures a dress.

See also

 1903 — In Arthur Conan Doyle's story The Adventure of the Dancing Men, Sherlock Holmes solves the puzzle of a mysterious sequence of stick figures.
 1908 — Emile Cohl's pioneer animated film Fantasmagorie features a stick figure as its main character.

References

External links

 Gerd Arntz and the Woodcut Origins of the Stick Figure
 The 50 AIGA symbols
BlueMaxima's Flashpoint (Flash Conservation Project)

Drawing
Animation techniques
Articles containing video clips